The Qatar Emiri Air Force (QEAF) is the air arm of the armed forces of the state of Qatar. It was established in 1974 as a small aerial support wing, although, in modern times It has evolved into a potent well equipped force. The QEAF is headquartered at Al-Udeid Air Base in Doha; the current commander is Brigadier General (Pilot) Jassem Mohamed Al-Mannai.

History
In March 1967, in response to the British announcement that it would withdraw its armed forces from the Persian Gulf, Qatar set up armed forces, creating the Qatar Public Security Forces Air Wing, equipped with two Westland Whirlwind helicopters. In 1971, it acquired a combat capability when it purchased three ex-RAF Hawker Hunter jet fighters, which remained in use until 1981. It was renamed the Qatar Emiri Air Force in 1974.

The air force began a major expansion in 1979, when it ordered six Alpha Jet trainer/light attack aircraft. This was followed by orders for 14 Mirage F1 supersonic jet fighters in 1980, which were delivered between 1980 and 1984. Twelve Gazelle helicopters, armed with HOT anti-tank missiles were received from 1983. Also in 1983, the air force took over the Qatar Police Air Wing.

In 1991, the Qatari Air Force took part in the Gulf War on the side of the allies.
 
In 2005, the Air Force participated in Exercise Eagle Resolve, along with Qatari medical services and emergency medical teams to build interoperability with their US counterparts. The US 26th Marine Expeditionary Unit took part in this exercise to validate the nation's crisis management plan prior to hosting the 2006 Asian Games.

Other acquisitions have been for an order of 59 AW139 helicopters. The helicopters are used for utility tasks, troop transport, search and rescue, border patrol, special forces operations, and law enforcement. Three additional aircraft were ordered in March 2011 for Medevac services.

By 2010, the Qatar Emiri Air Force's personnel strength was at 2,100 and its equipment included the Mirage 2000-3EDA, the SA 342L Gazelle, and the C-17A Globemaster III. Aircraft either flew out of al-Udeid field or Doha International Airport and received training from British instructors. In January 2011, the Air Force evaluated the Eurofighter Typhoon, the Lockheed Martin F-35 Lightning II, the Boeing F/A-18E/F Super Hornet, the McDonnell Douglas F-15E Strike Eagle and the Dassault Rafale to replace its current fighter inventory of Dassault Mirage 2000-5s.  In May 2015, the QAF awarded the contract for 24 Dassault Rafale fighters worth €6.3 billion ($7 billion).

In July 2012, the Qatar Air Force ordered a complete pilot training system from Pilatus centering upon the PC-21. The package included ground-based training devices, logistical support and maintenance in addition to 24 PC-21 aircraft.

In June 2015, the QAF ordered four additional C-17s, to supplement the existing four delivered in 2009 and 2012.

In September 2016, the sale of up to 72 F-15QAs to Qatar was submitted to the US Congress for approval. The deal (for 36 planes plus an option for 36 more), valued at US$21.1 billion, was signed in November 2016.

In September 2017, the QAF ordered 24 Typhoon fighter jets from the UK.
In December 2017, the QAF ordered 12 additional Rafale fighter jets from France, with an option for 36 more.

In August 2018, Qatar announced the construction of a new air base to be named after Emir Tamim bin Hamad Al Thani. In addition to the new air base, Al Udeid Air Base and Doha International Air Base are to be expanded in order to accommodate aircraft on order.

Airbases
Al Udeid Air Base
Flying Wing 5
51st Squadron 'Ababil' – 12 × McDonnell Douglas F-15QA Strike Eagle
52st Squadron 'Ababil' – 12 × McDonnell Douglas F-15QA Strike Eagle
53st Squadron 'Ababil' – 12 × McDonnell Douglas F-15QA Strike Eagle
 Transport Wing
10th Transport Squadron – 8 × Boeing C-17 Globemaster III
12th Transport Squadron – 4 × C-130/J-30 Super Hercules
3rd Rotary Wing
20th Squadron – 39 × AgustaWestland AW139
Al Zaeem Mohamed Bin Abdullah Al Attiyah Air College (at Al Udeid Airbase)
??   Squadron – 8 × MFI-395 Super Mushshak 
31st Squadron – 24 × Pilatus PC-21
??   Squadron – 6 × M-346 Master
6th Close Support Squadron – 14 × SA342 Gazelle (to be replaced with 16 x H125)
Doha International Air Base (at Doha International Airport)
U/I Fighter wing 
Al Dhariat Squadron – 24 × Eurofighter Typhoon
Flying Wing 1
7th Air Superiority Squadron – 9 × Mirage 2000-5EDA & 3 × Mirage 2000-5DDA
11th Close Support Squadron – 9 × Hawk Mk167
2nd Rotary Wing
8th Anti-Surface Vessel Squadron – NFH90
9th Multi-Role Squadron – NHIndustries NH90
41st Squadron – 24 × Boeing AH-64 Apache
Dukhan / Tamim Airbase
Flying Wing 6
1st Fighter Squadron 'Al Adiyat' – 31 × Dassault Rafale
RAF Leeming
11th RAF/QEAF AJT Training Squadron – 9 × Hawk T2
RAF Coningsby
No. 12 Squadron RAF – Eurofighter Typhoon

Aircraft

Current inventory

Retired
Previous notable aircraft operated consisted of the Mirage 2000, Westland Commando, Hawker Hunter, Dassault Mirage F1, Piper PA-34 Seneca, Boeing 707, Boeing 727, Westland Whirlwind, Britten-Norman Islander, and the Aérospatiale SA 330 Puma helicopter.

See also
Al Udeid Air Base
As Sayliyah Army Base
Military ranks of Qatar
Qatar Armed Forces

References

Military of Qatar
Air forces by country
Military units and formations established in 1974